Alfonsas Eidintas (born 4 January 1952 in Vaiguva, Kelmė District Municipality, Lithuania) is a historian, diplomat and novelist. He is Lithuania's Ambassador to Greece.

Scholar
Between 1969 and 1973, Alfonsas Eidintas studied history at Vilnius Pedagogical University. He went to serve as chief lecturer, docent, head of the Universal History Department, and Deputy Dean at that institution. From 1986 to 1993, he was the Deputy Director for Research at the Lithuanian Institute of History of the Lithuanian Academy of Sciences. He received his habilitation in 1990.

Diplomat
Eidintas entered the diplomatic service in 1993, serving as Lithuania's Ambassador to the United States. He also served as Lithuania's Ambassador Extraordinary and Plenipotentiary to Canada, Mexico, Norway, Israel, Cyprus, Ethiopia, South Africa and Nigeria. He also worked in the Ministry of Foreign Affairs, most recently as ambassador-at-large at the Foreign Ministry's Information and Public Relations Department. He was a lecturer at the Institute of International Relations and Political Science.

Author
As of 2009, he had authored 17 books and at least 50 scientific articles about Lithuanian history and politics and published a work of historic fiction, Ieškok Maskvos sfinkso ("In Search of the Moscow Sphinx").

Books
 Jonas Sliupas: Knyga mokiniams. 1989.
 Naujas poziuris i Lietuvos istorija. 1989.
 Antanas Smetona: Politines biografijos bruozai. 1990.
 Lietuvos Respublikos prezidentai. 1991.
 Slaptasis lietuviu diplomatas: istorinis detektyvas. 1992.
 Kazys Grinius: Ministras pirmininkas ir prezidentas. 1993
 Lietuviu kolumbai: Lietuviu emigracijos istorijos apybraiza. 1993. 
 Aleksandras Stulginskis: Lietuvos prezidentas, Gulago kalinys. 1995.
 Lietuvos ambasados rūmų Washington, D.C. istorija. 1996.
 Lithuania in European Politics: The Years of the First Republic, 1918–1940 (with Vytautas Zalys). 1999.
 President of Lithuania: Prisoner of the Gulag-a Biography of Aleksandras Stulginskis. 2001.
 Žydai, lietuviai ir holokaustas. 2002.
 Jews, Lithuanians and the Holocaust. 2003.
 Lithuanian Emigration to the United States 1868–1950. 2003.
 Ambasadorius = Ambassador: tarnyba savo valstybei svetur: skiriama Lietuvos Respublikos užsienio reikalų ministerijos 85 metų sukakčiai. 2003.
 Ieškok Maskvos sfinkso: istorinis romanas. 2006.
 Žydai, Izraelis ir palestiniečiai. 2007.
 Erelio sparnų dvelksmas: istorinis romanas: "Ieškok Maskvos sfinkso" tęsinys. 2008.
 Istorija kaip politika: įvykių raidos apžvalgos. 2008.
 Aukštai šaltos žvaigždės: istorinis romanas: "Ieškok Maskvos sfinkso" ir "Erelio sparnų dvelksmo" tęsinys. 2009.

References

1952 births
Living people
People from Kelmė District Municipality
20th-century Lithuanian historians
Lithuanian male writers
Lithuanian novelists
Lithuanian University of Educational Sciences alumni
Ambassadors of Lithuania to Canada
Ambassadors of Lithuania to Cyprus
Ambassadors of Lithuania to Ethiopia
Ambassadors of Lithuania to Israel
Ambassadors of Lithuania to Greece
Ambassadors of Lithuania to Mexico
Ambassadors of Lithuania to Nigeria
Ambassadors of Lithuania to Norway
Ambassadors of Lithuania to South Africa
Ambassadors of Lithuania to the United States
21st-century Lithuanian historians